Christian V, Count of Oldenburg (sometimes called Christian VI;  – after 6 April 1399) was the ruling count of Oldenburg from 1368 until 1398. He was born sometime before 1347 to Count Conrad I of Oldenburg and Ingeborg of Brunswick.  After his father died in 1347, he ruled Oldenburg jointly with his elder brother Conrad II, and after Conrad II's deaths in 1386, with the latter's son, Maurice II.

He married Agnes of Honstein, and the Danish Royal houses of Oldenburg and Schleswig-Holstein-Sonderburg-Glücksburg descend from him via his son and successor Dietrich, Count of Oldenburg.  Through the dynastic marriages of his descendants, he is an ancestor of many European Royal houses.

Ancestry

External links
Christian V of Oldenburg

Counts of Oldenburg
1340s births
Year of birth uncertain
14th-century deaths